Saint-Remy-la-Calonne is a commune in the Meuse department in Grand Est in north-eastern France.

The author Alain-Fournier, who died in 1914, was buried in the cemetery here after his body was identified in 1991. The main street through the village is known as Rue Alain Fournier in his honor.

See also
 Communes of the Meuse department
 Parc naturel régional de Lorraine

References

Saintremylacalonne